The clubs referred to are the clubs the players played for at the time of the competition as stated at FIFA.com.

Players marked in bold have been capped at full international level.

Group A

Head coach:  Paul Gludovatz

Head coach:  Dale Mitchell

Head coach:  José Sulantay

Head coach:  Eddie Hudanski

Group B

Head coach:  Jan Poulsen

Head coach:  Ginés Meléndez

Head coach:  Gustavo Ferrín

Head coach:  George Lwandamina

Group C

Head coach:  Peter Johnson

Head coach:  Jesús Ramírez

Head coach:  Stu Jacobs

Head coach:  José Couceiro

Group D

Head coach:  Nelson Rodrigues

Head coach:  Cho Dong-hyun

Head coach:  Michał Globisz

Head coach:  Thomas Rongen

Group E

Head coach:  Hugo Tocalli

Head coach:  Miroslav Soukup

Head coach:  Julio Dely Valdés

Head coach:  Jo Tong-sop

Group F

Head coach:  Geovanni Alfaro

Head coach:  Yasushi Yoshida

Head coach:  Ladan Bosso

Head coach:  Archie Gemmill

References

Squads
FIFA U-20 World Cup squads